Visions from the Spiral Generator is the fourth full-length album by Swedish progressive/folk metal band Vintersorg. It was released on 24 June 2002. This album saw a drastic shift in style in the band that was foreshadowed on the band's prior album, Cosmic Genesis. The lyrics continued to be mixed between English and Swedish, and the music continued to be even more progressive and technical, moving farther away from the band's original folk influences.

Track listing
All songs written and arranged by Vintersorg.

Personnel

Vintersorg
 Mr. V - all vocals, rhythm and lead guitars, keyboard, Hammond, loop editing
 Mattias Marklund  - lead and rhythm guitars

Additional musicians
 Asgeir Mickelson - drums
 Steve DiGiorgio - bass
 Nils Johansson - analogue synth, loop editing, Hammond on "Universums dunkla alfabet"
 Lazare - Hammond on "A Metaphysical Drama"

Production
Produced by Vintersorg
Engineered by Vintersorg and Borge Finstad
Mixed by Borge Finstad
Editing by Jeff Wagner

References

Vintersorg albums
2002 albums
Napalm Records albums